Attorney General Rutledge may refer to:

Arthur Rutledge (1843–1917), Attorney General of Queensland
Leslie Rutledge (born 1976), Attorney General of Arkansas